Estádio Antônio Aquino Lopes also known as Florestão is a football stadium in Rio Branco, Acre, Brazil.  The stadium was inaugurated on 2011 with a maximum capacity of 10,000 spectators.

References

Football venues in Acre (state)
Sports venues in Acre (state)
Sports venues completed in 2011
Rio Branco, Acre